Gonzalo Sabas Miranda Figueroa (born October 6, 1979) is a Chilean track and road cyclist, who currently rides for Chilean amateur team U.C. Curicó. He won a gold medal in the team pursuit at the 2007 Pan American Games in Rio de Janeiro, Brazil.

Major results

2001
 8th Overall Vuelta Ciclista de Chile
1st Stage 1
2003
 3rd Road race, National Road Championships
2004
 1st Stage 3 Tour de San Juan
 1st Stage 10 Vuelta Ciclista de Chile
 Pan American Track Championships
2nd  Points race
3rd  Team pursuit
2005
 1st  Team pursuit, Pan American Track Championships (with Marco Arriagada, Enzo Cesario, and Luis Fernando Sepúlveda)
 1st Stage 4a Vuelta Ciclista Por Un Chile Lider
 8th Overall Vuelta Ciclista de Chile
 9th Overall Vuelta Ciclista Por Un Chile Lider
2006
 1st  Team pursuit, Pan American Track Championships
 Tour de San Juan
1st Stages 5, 6 & 9
 1st Stage 6 Vuelta a Mendoza
 1st Stage 4a Vuelta Ciclista de Chile
2007
 1st  Team pursuit, Pan American Games (with Marco Arriagada, Enzo Cesario, and Luis Fernando Sepúlveda)
 1st Stage 2a Vuelta Ciclista Por Un Chile Lider
 2nd  Madison, Pan American Track Championships
2008
 1st  Road race, National Road Championships
 1st Prologue Vuelta a Mendoza
 1st Stage 2 Vuelta a Toledo
2011
 2nd  Team pursuit, Pan American Games
2017
 1st Stage 5 Vuelta Ciclista de Chile
 1st Stage 8 Vuelta a Mendoza

References

External links

 

1979 births
Living people
Chilean male cyclists
Chilean track cyclists
Cyclists at the 2007 Pan American Games
Cyclists at the 2011 Pan American Games
Cyclists at the 2015 Pan American Games
Vuelta Ciclista de Chile stage winners
Place of birth missing (living people)
Pan American Games medalists in cycling
Pan American Games gold medalists for Chile
Pan American Games silver medalists for Chile
Medalists at the 2007 Pan American Games
Medalists at the 2011 Pan American Games
20th-century Chilean people
21st-century Chilean people